Edith Anne Robertson (10 Jan 1883 – 31 Jan 1973) was a Scottish poet who wrote in both the English and Scots tongues.

Biography

Edith Anne Stewart was born in Glasgow, to Jane Louisa Faulds and Robert Stewart, a civil engineer.  She attended the Glasgow High School for Girls. Her family lived in Germany and in Surrey, England, during her childhood.

In 1919 she married the Rev. Professor James Alexander Robertson of Aberdeen, also the child of a Free Church Minister.  They moved to Aberdeen, where James obtained a position as Professor of New Testament Language, Literature and Theology at the United Free Church College in Aberdeen. He wrote a number of well-received works on the New Testament, and was said to have been an effective preacher.

In 1938 James was appointed Professor of Biblical Criticism at the University of Aberdeen. He remained there until he was forced to retire in 1945 due to poor health.

James Alexander Robertson died in 1955.  Edith lived on for almost twenty years.

Work

Edith Anne Robertson's work reflects her strong belief in Christianity and her interest in the culture and language of the north east of Scotland.
In 1930 she published Carmen Jesu Nazereni, a verse version of the gospels.  She also published a life of Francis Xavier. 
Later she published two collections of poems by Walter de la Mare and Gerard Manley Hopkins that she had translated into the Scots language.
She corresponded with many literary figures including Marion Angus, David Daiches, Flora Garry, Nan Shepherd, Douglas Young and Samuel Beckett.

Her poem The Scots Tongue (1955) gives her thoughts on the language that she loved:
Gin I'm a livan tongue loe me;
Saebins we'll hae mair bairns;
Gin I'm a deid tongue nae call for keenin,
Ye'll find me wi the gods
Ayont the Reaveries o Time:
Yon are the gowden tongues!
In 1953 Douglas Young wrote to Edith Anne Robertson of her Voices that it was "a truly astonishing challenge to those who think the Lallans incapable of conveying thought (as E. Muir incautiously maintained in 'Scott and Scotland') and incapable of expressing subtleties of feeling (as MacCraig too often assents).  Moreover it does fill the gap I emphasised (in my Nelson anthology), when I remarked on the comparative lack of mystical verse in Scots."
A critic wrote in the Scottish international Review  that "in verse, Edith Anne Robertson used a supple and graceful Scots, carrying a large vocabulary with apparent ease in well-varied metres."

Bibliography

References

Sources

1883 births
1973 deaths
Lallans poets
Writers from Glasgow
Scottish women poets
20th-century Scottish poets
20th-century British women writers
20th-century Scottish women